Iryna Pidkuiko (born 18 June 1989) is a Ukrainian women's football goalkeeper. She played in the Turkish Women's First Football League for ALG Spor with jersey number 22. She was part of the Ukraine women's national U-19 team.

Playing career

Club
Pidkuiko played in her country for FC Ateks-Sdushor-16 in Kyiv, WFC Zhytlobud-1 Kharkiv in Kharkiv, FC Illichivka Mariupol in Mariupol, WFC Panthery, and FC Yatran Uman in Uman. In 2012, she enjoyed champion title of the Ukrainian Women's League with her team WFC Zhytlobud-1 Kharkiv.

In 2018, Pidkuiko moved to Turkey, and signed with the Gaziantep-based club ALG Spor, which were recently promoted to the Women's First League.

Career statistics
.

Honours
 Ukrainian Women's League
 WFC Zhytlobud-1 Kharkiv
 Winners (1): 2012

References

Living people
1989 births
Ukrainian women's footballers
Women's association football goalkeepers
Expatriate women's footballers in Turkey
Ukrainian expatriate sportspeople in Turkey
WFC Zhytlobud-1 Kharkiv players
ALG Spor players